Parastenophis is a genus of snake in the family Pseudoxyrhophiidae that contains the sole species Parastenophis betsileanus.

It is found in Madagascar.

References 

Monotypic snake genera
Reptiles described in 1880
Reptiles of Madagascar
Pseudoxyrhophiidae
Taxa named by Frank Glaw
Taxa named by Miguel Vences